PMR446 (Private Mobile Radio, 446 MHz) is a licence exempt service in the UHF radio frequency band and is available for  business and personal use in most countries throughout the European Union.

PMR446 is typically used for small-site, same-building and line of sight outdoor activities. Equipment used ranges from consumer-grade to professional quality walkie-talkies (similar to those used for FRS/GMRS in the United States and Canada). Depending on surrounding terrain range can vary from a few hundred metres (in a city) to a few kilometres (flat countryside) to many kilometres from high ground.

Historically, analogue FM is used but a digital voice mode has been available in radios conforming to digital private mobile radio (dPMR446) and digital mobile radio (DMR Tier 1) standards designed by ETSI.

Originally 8 channels were available in analogue mode but this has now been increased to 16 channels.
Typically PMR446 is used for both recreational and business use, additionally it has been utilized by amateur-radio operators and radio enthusiasts as a license-free experimental band.

History
The first steps towards creating licence-free short range radio communications were taken in April 1997 when the European Radio Communications Committee decided on a 446 MHz frequency band to be used for the new radios. In November 1998, ERC Decision (98)25 allocated frequency band 446.0–446.1 MHz  for analogue PMR446; another two decisions established licence exemption for PMR446 equipment and free circulation of the PMR446 equipment. The first country which introduced these frequencies for licence-free use was Ireland on 1 April 1998. The United Kingdom introduced PMR446 service in April 1999; since 2003, it has replaced the former short-range business radio (SRBR) service.

In October 2005, ECC Decision (05)02 added unlicensed band 446.1–446.2 MHz for use by digital DMR/dPMR equipment.

In July 2015, ECC Decision (15)05 doubled the number of analog channels to 16 by extending analog operation onto the 446.1–446.2 MHz band previously used by digital DMR/dPMR equipment, effective January 2016; from January 2018, the number of digital channels was doubled by extending onto the 446.0–446.1 MHz band used by analog FM.

Range
Until recently, PMR446 radios were handheld transceivers with fixed antennas (see Technical information). In November 2015, Midland Radio announced the release of the GB1 mobile PMR446 radio for vehicular use.

The range of PMR446, just like any VHF or UHF radio, is dependent on many factors like environment (in-city range is far less than in an open field), height above surrounding obstructions,  and, to a lesser extent, weather conditions. The antenna type and location, transmit power and receive sensitivity also affect range. However, with PMR446 most of these variables are fixed at manufacturing to comply with the PMR446 specifications. Most of the time the maximum range that a user in a city can expect is a few hundred metres or less.

Range may be many kilometres, for example between hilltops, or only a few hundred metres, if for example a hill or large metal object is in the transmission path between radios. The best known long-distance record is 333 mi (535.8 km) from Blyth in the United Kingdom to Almere, Netherlands. This was the result of enhanced propagation conditions, not a line-of-sight signal.

Use worldwide
PMR446 radios use frequencies that in Australia, the U.S., and Canada are allocated to amateur radio operators, and military radar systems.

Instead, the U.S., Canada and Mexico use the Family Radio Service (FRS) system, which provides a similar service on different frequencies, around 462 and 467 MHz. These frequencies are allocated to the emergency services in Europe, notably the fire brigade in the UK, police in Russia and commercial users in Australia. Interference with licensed radio services may result in prosecution.

Australia, New Zealand, Vanuatu and Malaysia use the UHF Citizen's Band system in the 476–477 MHz range and a maximum power output of 5 W giving improved range over the lower power PMR system.

PMR446-compliant equipment may be used anywhere throughout Europe.

Type approved PMR446 radios with power up to 500 mW can be used without any licence in India and Vietnam.  The devices may not be base stations or repeaters, and must use integrated antennas only.

Technical information
PMR446 covers band 446.0–446.2 MHz. The general ECC decision however still requires integral antennas and the actual implementation varies between different countries.

Analogue FM and digital TDMA

Analogue PMR446 uses 16 FM channels separated by 12.5 kHz from each other. Maximum power is 500 mW ERP and equipment must be used on a mobile basis. CTCSS is usually used, with more upmarket models also featuring DCS and/or fixed-carrier voice inversion. Before January 2016, only the lower 8 channels were allowed for analog FM operation.

For those older PMR446 radios with 38 codes, the codes 0 to 38 are CTCSS Tones:

For those newer PMR446 radios with 121 codes, codes 0 to 38 are as above while codes 39 to 121 are DCS codes:

Digital PMR446 DMR Tier I (TDMA) uses 16 digital voice channels separated by 12.5 kHz from each other with 4-level FSK modulation at 3.6 kbit/s. Before January 2018, only the higher 8 channels were allowed for digital TDMA operation.

Some Digital PMR446 radios (Hytera BD305LF, Retevis RT40, ...) support Dual Capacity Direct Mode (DCDM), which allows for the use of two timeslots during simplex (radio-to-radio) communication. This effectively doubles the channel capacity by allowing two simultaneous transmissions on one channel.

Color Code (0 to 16) is the equivalent of CTCSS for digital. It's used to isolate a population of users (a company, an association, a family, ...).

By convention CC1 is used for public contact.

TalkGroups are used to separate groups of users (ex: TG1 for direction and TG2 for room service in a hotel using channel 12 CC7).

By contacting a specific TG, each user subscribing to this TG will hear you (Group Call).

A user can subscribe to many TGs (RX Group List).

It is also possible to contact all users in your color code (All Call).

Radio ID One for each user, to be contacted directly (Private Call).

Analog (NFM) and digital TDMA (DMR)

Digital FDMA
Digital PMR446 dPMR (FDMA) uses 32 digital voice channels separated by 6.25 kHz from each other with 4-level FSK modulation at 3.6 kbit/s. Before January 2018, only the upper 16 channels were allowed for digital FDMA operation.

PMR446 gateways
Recently some users have implemented the simplex repeater system, a cheap and easy way to extend the radio range by using extra radios connected to a small repeater controller. This is also known as "Parrot", "ATX-2000" or just "Echo Repeater" after how it sounds repeating every transmission it receives.

PMR446 gateways extend the range of PMR446. These gateways are connected through internet using a client/server VoIP system such as eQSO or the Free Radio Network (FRN).

Law
Decision ERC (98) 25
Decision ERC (98) 26
Decision ERC (98) 27
Decision ECC (05) 12
Decision ECC (15) 05

See also
70-centimeter band
KDR 444 
LPD433
Personal radio service
Public Radio Service
Business band

References

External links

PMR Radio (eQSO for PMR)
Bandplan 433MHz (LPD and PMR Frequencies)
General PMR446 Website (and UK forum)

Bandplans
Radio hobbies
Radio technology
Radio regulations